The Netherlands women's national cricket team toured Sri Lanka in March 1999. They played Sri Lanka in 5 One Day Internationals, losing the series 5–0.

Squads

WODI Series

1st ODI

2nd ODI

3rd ODI

4th ODI

5th ODI

References

External links
Netherlands Women tour of Sri Lanka 1998/99 from Cricinfo

1999 in women's cricket
Women's international cricket tours of Sri Lanka
Sri Lanka